Lithoredo is a genus of shipworm native to the Abatan River in the Philippines. It contains a single species, Lithoredo abatanica, described in June 2019.  The species is unusual because, unlike other shipworms which mainly bore into wood, it tunnels into and excretes limestone. It lacks the cecum which in other shipworms holds symbiotic bacteria which digest wood. Compared to other shipworms, lithoredo have differently shaped teeth which can finely grind stone. The worms use the tunnels to live in but their method of eating is not yet known. They may get nutrition from bacteria in their gills.

References

Teredinidae
Molluscs described in 2019
Bivalve genera
Monotypic mollusc genera